Turn Left, Turn Right is a 2003 romance film, filmed in Taipei, Taiwan. Produced and directed by Johnnie To and Wai Ka-Fai, the film stars Takeshi Kaneshiro and Gigi Leung. The story is based on the illustrated book A Chance of Sunshine by Taiwanese author Jimmy Liao, who makes a cameo appearance with his wife and daughter in the film. It is also the first Chinese-language Asian film ever from produced and distributed by Warner Bros. Pictures.

The original graphic novel was first published in 1999. The characters in the novel were not given names, both characters were only referred to as "him" and "her". Chinese title of the book translates to "Turn Left, Turn Right", A Chance of Sunshine is the original English title of the book, on the newer published editions the English title is shown as "Turn Left, Turn Right". The book consists of a series of detailed illustrated images, with a small amount of text in poetry style. The film has managed to include every single image in the book with a high level of accuracy, although some are fleeting.

Plot
The story tells of two people who live in buildings right next to each other, separated only by a wall, and are always near each other but can't seem to see one another.

John Liu is a violinist who works from job to job. During one of his gigs, he meets June, who offers to give him a ride home. However she flirts aggressively with John during the ride which frightens him. To get away from her he jumps out of her car and makes a run for his apartment building. The next day he sees her waiting for him on the left corner of his building which makes him avoid going to the left of his building.

Eve Choi is a translator for a book publishing company. Her job is to translate foreign books into Chinese. She is given the daunting task of translating a horror novel into Chinese. At night while translating the horror novel she gets frightened and thinks her home is haunted. The next day she notices a scary-looking tree to the right of her apartment building and, frightened, she refuses to go to the right of her building.

John and Eve meet by accident at the park fountain, when he helps her pick up her papers that have fallen into the fountain. They find out that they had met each other when they were younger at an amusement park, when both their schools had organized a field trip to the same place. Then, Eve had asked John for his telephone number, but the two never got in touch because she left her school bag on the train and lost John's phone number. The two laugh about the past and exchange phone numbers without asking for each other's name before parting quickly because of a coming rainstorm.

That night, both are happy and excited to have met each other again, but both also came down with the flu because of the earlier rainstorm. The flu medication John has on hand has expired and he decides not to take it. Eve is overjoyed and forgets to take her medication. The next day the two are devastated to find out that the phone numbers they had exchanged are unreadable due to the paper getting wet during the rainstorm. Both can only make out a few numbers and vainly call several phone numbers at random hoping to get through to one another.

One of the numbers they called is a restaurant that Ruby works at as a waitress and delivery person. Both John and Eve, ill and not wanting to leave their home because they're afraid that they would miss the other person's phone call, decides to order delivery from Ruby's restaurant. Ruby falls in love with John at first sight when she arrives at his home to make her delivery. Seeing the smudged pieces of paper on both John and Eve's table, Ruby soon finds out that the two are trying to find each other. To distract John from the apartment located in the next building Ruby tells him an old lady lives in that apartment.

John's and Eve's flu become so severe that they are both taken to the hospital, John by Ruby and Eve by an ambulance. They both meet Dr. Hu, but Dr. Hu happens to be a former university classmate of Eve's, who has a crush on her. He tells Eve that it must be fate that they met each other again and proceeds to check her into the hospital to get the best care possible, while discharging John from the hospital, changing his mind only when Ruby argues with him about how severe John's illness is. Both John and Eve give their home keys to Ruby and Dr. Hu to set up voicemail at their home in case the other person calls.

Once John and Eve are discharged from the hospital they find out that Dr. Hu and Ruby had literally moved into each of their apartments, but both make it clear that they are not interested in them since they already love someone else. Heartbroken, drunk and sobbing to each other Dr. Hu and Ruby decide to get together. Taking revenge on John and Eve for breaking their hearts, they send pictures to them showing how many places they had missed finding each other. John and Eve find Dr. Hu and Ruby to talk about the pictures they had received in the mail. Ruby gives Eve's phone number to John telling him it's her number to test if she was ever in his heart and Dr. Hu does the same to Eve, but they do not call.

John and Eve are frustrated about not being able to find each other and decide to take jobs abroad. On the day they are to leave Taiwan, an earthquake strikes, destroying the wall that separates their apartment. Both finally find each other.

Cast

Main cast 
Takeshi Kaneshiro as John Liu
Gigi Leung as Eve Choi
Edmund Chen as Dr Hu
Terri Kwan as Ruby

Supporting cast 
Lam Suet as Restaurant Manager (John's boss at the Italian restaurant)
Benz Hui as George (Eve's boss) 
Four Tse Liu-Shut as Music producer
Wong Tak-Chi as Eve's landlord
Wong Lei as John's landlady
Beatrice Hsu as June
Klaus Bru as Ghoul

Cameo 
Jimmy Liao and his family as family by the water fountain

Cantonese dubbing 
Kaneshiro and Leung did their own Cantonese voice dubbing. Edmund Chen and Terri Kwan character's voices were dubbed by other people in the Cantonese version.
Chan Suk Yee as Dr Hu
Angela Tong as Ruby

Filming locations
Turn Left, Turn Right was filmed entirely in Taipei, Taiwan. The apartment buildings that John and Eve lived at are located in Fujing Street in the Songshan District of Taipei. 
Fujing Street
Shin Kong Mitsukoshi Department Store, Taipei
Fat Angelo's Italian Restaurant – Ximending 
Sweetme Hotspring Resort – Beitou
Warner Village
Core Pacific City
MRT Beitou Station
Taipei City Hospital Yangming Branch
Fan Guan Er Korean Restaurant Daan District
Ximending
Xinyi, Taipei City Hall Plaza, Shin Kong Mitsukoshi

Music

Turn Left, Turn Right Original Soundtrack (CD+VCD) (向左走、向右走 – 電影原聲大碟) was released on 15 August 2003 for the Hong Kong release of the film only by Warner Music Hong Kong. It features 22 tracks and a bonus VCD. Two different album covers were released for the same album. One showing only Kaneshiro and the other only Leung, both are at the same scene searching for someone amongst a crowd of people. Songs featured on the soundtrack are Cantonese version of each song, Mandarin version of the soundtrack was not released. "Encounter 遇見" by Stefanie Sun is not featured on the soundtrack since "At The Carousel 迴旋木馬的終端" by Gigi Leung is the Cantonese version of the same song. "Encounter 遇見" can be found on Stefanie Sun's 2003 album "The Moment 關鍵時刻".

Bonus VCD

Reception

Box office 
Turn Left, Turn Right grossed SGD860 thousand in Singapore and was Singapore's best grossing Chinese romantic film as of September 2003. The film grossed SGD1.07 million in Hong Kong as of September 2003.

Critical response 
Derek Elley of Variety felt that the film is a "pure piece of fluff that’s sustained by clever plot twists".

Awards

Poem
The poem recited by the main female protagonist of this film is ""Love at First Sight" ("Miłość od pierwszego wejrzenia") by famous Polish poet, essayist and translator Wisława Szymborska, who received the Nobel Prize in Literature in 1996. The film used the translation of Walter Whipple. Another popular translation of the poem is by Stanisław Barańczak and Clare Cavanagh.

References

External links

 
Turn Left, Turn Right at HKMDB

2003 films
2000s Mandarin-language films
2000s Cantonese-language films
Polish-language films
Hong Kong romantic comedy-drama films
Singaporean romantic comedy films
Films based on comic strips
Milkyway Image films
Films directed by Johnnie To
Films directed by Wai Ka-Fai
2000s romance films
Films with screenplays by Yau Nai-hoi
Films with screenplays by Wai Ka-fai
2000s Hong Kong films